is a city located in Ibaraki Prefecture, Japan. , the city had an estimated population of 40,254 in 15,839 households and a population density of 257 persons per km². The percentage of the population aged over 65 was 32.0%. The city takes its name from the nearby lake, Lake Kasumigaura. The city has the distinction of having the longest name in Japan (in terms of the number of characters used), together with Ichikikushikino, Kagoshima Prefecture and Tsukubamirai. Much of the city is within the borders of the Suigō-Tsukuba Quasi-National Park.

Geography
Kasumigaura is located in central Ibaraki Prefecture, on a peninsula bordered by Lake Kasumigaura on two sides to the southeast and southwest. It is approximately 60 kilometers to the northeast of Tokyo.

Surrounding municipalities
Ibaraki Prefecture
 Ishioka
 Tsuchiura

Climate
Kasumigaura has a humid continental climate (Köppen Cfa) characterized by warm summers and cold winters with heavy snowfall.  The average annual temperature in Kasumigaura is 13.7 °C. The average annual rainfall is 1311 mm with September as the wettest month. The temperatures are highest on average in August, at around 25.8 °C, and lowest in January, at around 2.7 °C.

Demographics
Per Japanese census data, the population of Kasumigaura peaked around the year 2000 and has declined since.

History
The village of Dejima was established within Niihari District on February 11, 1955 through the merger of the villages of Shimootsu, Minami, Ushiwata, Saga, Anshoku and Shishiko. It was elevated to town status on April 1, 1997 and was renamed Kasumigaura. The town of Kasumigaura merged with the neighboring town of Chiyoda on March 28, 2005, becoming the city of Kasumigaura.

Government
Kasumigaura has a mayor-council form of government with a directly elected mayor and a unicameral city council of 16 members. Kasumigaura contributes one member to the Ibaraki Prefectural Assembly. In terms of national politics, the city is part of Ibaraki 6th district of the lower house of the Diet of Japan.

Economy
Kasumigaura has primarily an agricultural economy, with lotus roots, and various fruits as the major cash crops. Aquaculture on Lake Kasumigaura also plays a role.

Education
Kasumigaura has eight public elementary schools and three public middle schools operated by the city government. The city does have a public high school, but it has one private combined elementary/middle school and one private high school.

Transportation

Railway
Kasumigaura does not have any passenger railway service.

Highway
  – Chiyoda-Ishioka Interchange

Local attractions
Lake Kasumigaura

Notable people from Kasumigaura 
Katsuhiko Saka, professional baseball player

References

External links

  

Cities in Ibaraki Prefecture
Kasumigaura, Ibaraki